Causeyella youngsteadtorum, Youngsteadt's cave millipede, is a ghostly white millipede, first collected in 1976 by Norman and Jean Youngsteadt, but not recognized as a new species until 2003. It has been found in seven caves in Boone and Searcy counties in Arkansas.

References

Chordeumatida
Cave millipedes
Animals described in 2003
Endemic fauna of Arkansas